In mathematics, in the field of group theory, a subgroup H of a given group G is a subnormal subgroup of G if there is a finite chain of subgroups of the group, each one normal in the next, beginning at H and ending at G.

In notation,  is -subnormal in  if there are subgroups

A subnormal subgroup is a subgroup that is -subnormal for some positive integer .
Some facts about subnormal subgroups:
 A 1-subnormal subgroup is a proper normal subgroup (and vice versa).
 A finitely generated group is nilpotent if and only if each of its subgroups is subnormal.
 Every quasinormal subgroup, and, more generally, every conjugate-permutable subgroup, of a finite group is subnormal.
 Every pronormal subgroup that is also subnormal, is normal. In particular, a Sylow subgroup is subnormal if and only if it is normal.
 Every 2-subnormal subgroup is a conjugate-permutable subgroup.

The property of subnormality is transitive, that is, a subnormal subgroup of a subnormal
subgroup is subnormal. The relation of subnormality can be defined as the transitive closure of the relation of normality.

If every subnormal subgroup of G is normal in G, then G is called a T-group.

See also
Characteristic subgroup
Normal core
Normal closure
Ascendant subgroup
Descendant subgroup
Serial subgroup

References
 
 

Subgroup properties